Aemene punctatissima is a moth of the family Erebidae. It was described by Gustave Arthur Poujade in 1886. It is found in China (Ichang, Chan-yang, Wa-shan, Omeishan, Chia-ting-fu, Wa-ssu-kow, Cheton and Niton).

References

Cisthenina
Moths described in 1886
Moths of Asia